Idempotency of entailment is a property of logical systems that states that one may derive the same consequences from many instances of a hypothesis as from just one.   This property can be captured by a structural rule called contraction, and in such systems one may say that entailment is idempotent if and only if contraction is an admissible rule.

Rule of contraction: from

A,C,C → B

is derived
  
A,C → B.

Or in sequent calculus notation,

In linear and affine logic, entailment is not idempotent.

See also
 No-deleting theorem

Logical consequence
Theorems in propositional logic